The Nancy Hanks was a popular Central of Georgia Railway and later Southern Railway passenger train in Georgia running between Atlanta and Savannah. It was named after a race horse that was named for Abraham Lincoln's mother. The name is even older than the mid-20th century train derived from that of a short-lived but famous steam special, the Nancy Hanks. The earlier Nancy operated in 1892 and 1893.

History 
Nancy Hanks II made its first trip on July 17, 1947. The new train's cars were painted blue and gray and, like the first Nancy, each bore a likeness of the famed trotter on the side.

"The Nancy", as it was affectionately known, was an all-coach, reserved-seat train with grill lounge service. The train had an average speed of 48 mph (including stops) and made the  journey in 6 hours. It left the Central of Georgia Depot in Savannah daily at 7 a.m., running to Atlanta Terminal Station via Macon Terminal Station, and returned from Atlanta at 6 p.m. (18:00).

Black and white passengers were separated on this pocket streamliner until the 1960s. Four "divided" segregated coaches were built by American Car & Foundry (ACF) for Nancy, and African-Americans were not allowed to eat in the grill-lounge car.  The Central of Georgia was the last major Southern railroad to desegregate. Since it ran only in Georgia and did not engage in interstate commerce, it was not subject to the Interstate Commerce Commission's 1961 order to desegregate.

In the 1960s the Central leased a dome car from the Norfolk and Western-Wabash line, where it had operated for a number of years; the car was thoroughly renovated for service on the Nancy Hanks II. The dome parlor-lounge car was 85 feet (26 m) long, made of steel and originally was built by Pullman-Standard. It had a dark-blue exterior and interior upholstery in royal blue and gray. In keeping with the racehorse theme, the lounge beneath the dome was branded the "Saddle & Stirrup."

Despite its popularity in Middle Georgia, the Nancy suffered a marked decline in ridership during the 1960s, in tandem with the larger decline of rail service during this period. While Southern opted to stay in the passenger business when Amtrak took over most passenger service, the Nancy was not among the routes retained. As a result, the Nancy made its last run on April 30, 1971, the day before Amtrak came into being. Atlanta's Terminal Station  was demolished the following year.

References

Passenger trains of the Central of Georgia Railway
Named passenger trains of the United States
Railway services introduced in 1947
1971 disestablishments
Railway services discontinued in 1971